The 2016 One Love Tennis Open was a professional tennis tournament played on outdoor hard courts. It was the 1st edition of the tournament and part of the 2016 ITF Women's Circuit, offering a total of $50,000 in prize money. It took place in Atlanta, United States, on 12–18 September 2016.

Singles main draw entrants

Seeds 

 1 Rankings as of 29 August 2016.

Other entrants 
The following player received a wildcard into the singles main draw:
  Anna Bright
  Sophie Chang
  Julia Elbaba
  Alexandra Sanford

The following players received entry from the qualifying draw:
  Marta González Encinas
  Brianna Morgan
  Ingrid Neel
  Luisa Stefani

Champions

Singles

 Elise Mertens def.  Melanie Oudin, 6–4, 6–2

Doubles

 Ingrid Neel /  Luisa Stefani def.  Alexandra Stevenson /  Taylor Townsend, 4–6, 6–4, [10–5]

External links 
 2016 One Love Tennis Open at ITFtennis.com
 Official website

2016 ITF Women's Circuit
2016 in American tennis
Tennis tournaments in the United States